Behrouz Hayriev (born 1 May 1998) is a Tajikistani professional football player who last played for Kuktosh Rudaki.

Career

Club
In February 2018, Hayriev joined FC Istiklol on trial, before joining the club permanently.

On 28 February 2019, Hayriev's contract with Istiklol was terminated by mutual consent.

International
Hayriev made his senior team debut on 12 October 2018 against Palestine.

Career statistics

Club

International

Statistics accurate as of match played 12 October 2018

References

External links
 
 

1998 births
Living people
Tajikistani footballers
Tajikistan international footballers
FC Istiklol players
Association football goalkeepers